The WABA Champions Cup 2009 was the 12th staging of the WABA Champions Cup, the basketball club tournament of West Asia Basketball Association. The tournament was held in Amman, Jordan between March 13 and March 21. The top three teams from different countries qualify for the 2009 FIBA Asia Champions Cup.

Preliminary round

Group A

Group B

Final round

Quarterfinals

Semifinals 5th–8th

Semifinals

7th place

5th place

3rd place

Final

Final standing

External links
www.goalzz.com

2009
International basketball competitions hosted by Jordan
2008–09 in Asian basketball
2008–09 in Jordanian basketball
2008–09 in Iranian basketball
2008–09 in Lebanese basketball
2009 in Syrian sport
2009 in Iraqi sport
Bask